My Little Pony is a 1986–1987 American animated television series produced by Sunbow Productions and Marvel Productions and animated by Toei Animation and AKOM based on the My Little Pony toys released by Hasbro. The series featured as the first segment of a program called My Little Pony 'n Friends. The second segment would be an unrelated cartoon based on another Hasbro franchise – including The Glo Friends, MoonDreamers and the Potato Head Kids. The series debuted on September 15, 1986, nearly three months after the release of My Little Pony: The Movie (which had introduced the Paradise Estate and many of the series' main characters), and ended on September 25, 1987. Two previous television specials were edited into segments of My Little Pony 'n Friends: Rescue at Midnight Castle and Escape from Catrina. The complete series of My Little Pony segments has been released on DVD in Regions 1 and 4. Other sections have been released on DVD such as "My Little Pony: The Glo Friends" as of 2013.

Synopsis 
Ponyland is a mystical land, home to all kinds of magical creatures. The Little Ponies make their home in Paradise Estate, living a peaceful life filled with song and games. However, not all of the creatures of Ponyland are so peaceful, and the Ponies often find themselves having to fight for survival against witches, trolls, goblins and all the other beasts that would love to see the Little Ponies destroyed, enslaved or otherwise harmed.

Cast 
 Bettina Bush as Megan
 Charlie Adler as Spike
 Susan Blu as Buttons, Paradise
 Nancy Cartwright as Gusty, Baby Heart Throb, Baby Cuddles, Posey, Truly, Honeysuckle, Surf Rider
 Jeannie Elias as Whizzer, Masquerade, Baby Lickety-Split, Magic Star, Sweet Stuff, Sun Shower
 Ellen Gerstell as Lofty, Locket, Mimic, Scoops
 Skip Hinnant as narrator
 Keri Houlihan as Molly
 Katie Leigh as Fizzy, Heart Throb, Lickety-Split, Ribbon, Baby Shady, Baby Gusty, Baby Tiddley-Winks, Water Lily
 Sherry Lynn as Galaxy, Gingerbread, Cherries Jubilee, Baby Half-Note, Baby Ribbon, Baby Sundance
 Scott Menville as Danny
 Sarah Partridge as Wind Whistler
 Russi Taylor as Cupcake, Rosedust, Morning Glory
 B. J. Ward as Surprise, North Star, Peach Blossom, Forget-Me-Not
 Jill Wayne as Baby Lofty, Shady

Additional voices by Michael Bell, Joey Camen, Melanie Gaffin, Tress MacNeille, and Frank Welker

Broadcast

International 
In the UK, the animated series first aired on November 7, 1987 on MTV.

In Russia, a dubbed version in Russian was released on the channel 2x2 from 1993 to 1995.

Characters 

 Earth Ponies are like normal horses, but brightly colored as many creatures in Ponyland are.
 Pegasus Ponies are agile winged horses who can fly in the skies of Ponyland and even go beyond the rainbow to our world.
 Unicorn Ponies possess a single horn on their forehead; all are able to 'wink in' and 'wink out' (short range teleport) and possess a unique individual ability (e.g. telepathy, telekinesis, aerokinesis, hydrokinesis, and intuition).
 Flutter Ponies are shy but powerful creatures with magic in their gossamer wings, granting them flight as well as various undefined abilities. They live in an area of Ponyland known as Flutter Valley.
 Sea Ponies are brightly colored seahorse-like creatures who dwell in the rivers and lakes of Ponyland.
 The Bushwoolies, a joyful species of furballs with a hive mind mentality, causing them to usually think alike and in agreement. They seem to be led by a blue Bushwoolie named Hugster.
 The Furbobs, cousins of the Bushwoolies. They primarily walk on four legs as opposed to Bushwoolies who seem to walk on the equivalent of two legs. Unlike the Bushwoolies, they constantly disagree with each other. Any agreement between them usually signals an emergency situation.
 Stonebacks, ferocious looking armadillo-like creatures. They were enemies of the Furbobs until Megan helped the Furbobs realize that the two species can overcome their hostilities through friendship and understanding.
 The Grundles, a small race of creatures ruled by the Grundle King. They used to live in Grundleland before it was smoozed (in My Little Pony: The Movie); they now live in Dream Castle.
 Three human children, siblings Megan, Danny, and Molly, often fly across the Rainbow to join the Little Ponies.
 The characters often seek advice on magical matters from the Moochick, a wise but eccentric gnome who lives in the nearby Mushromp with his rabbit assistant, Habbit.

Episodes

My Little Pony 'n Friends, Season 1 (1986)

My Little Pony 'n Friends, Season 2 (1987)

Home media

DVD releases

UK VHS releases 
 St. Michael (Marks and Spencer), Tempo Video (MSD Video, Tempo Super Video Then: Tempo Kids Club) (1987–1993)

Notes

References

External links 
 

My Little Pony television series
1984 American television series debuts
1987 American television series endings
1980s American animated television series
1980s American anthology television series
American children's animated adventure television series
American children's animated anthology television series
American children's animated fantasy television series
American children's animated musical television series
1980s toys
English-language television shows
First-run syndicated television programs in the United States
Animated television series about horses
Television series by Hasbro Studios
Television series by Marvel Productions
Television series set in fictional countries
Television series by Sunbow Entertainment
Television series by Claster Television